Christina Schütze (also spelled Schuetze, born 25 October 1983) is a German field hockey player who competed in the 2008 Summer Olympics and 2012 Summer Olympics.

References

External links
 
 
 
 

1985 births
Living people
German female field hockey players
Olympic field hockey players of Germany
Field hockey players at the 2008 Summer Olympics
Field hockey players at the 2012 Summer Olympics
21st-century German women